"Heartbeat" is a song written by Colin Newman and originally recorded and released in 1978 by the English rock band Wire on their second album Chairs Missing. Guest Kate Lukas played flute on the track.

The song was not uncommon as either an opener or a closer of Wire's live sets at the time. Producer Mike Thorne has called it the band's "first overt love song".

Big Black version 

"Heartbeat" was covered and released as a single in 1987 by Chicago post-hardcore band Big Black. Apart from the Wire cover, the other two tracks on the record are originals. This 7" record was sold together with the Headache EP or used for promotional give-aways. The three tracks were eventually reissued on The Rich Man's Eight Track Tape compilation.

Track listing
"Heartbeat" - 3:48
"Things to Do Today" - 1:44
"I Can't Believe" - 1:04

References 

Wire (band) songs
1978 songs
Big Black songs
1987 singles